Valery E. Forbes is an American ecologist and professor specializing in environmental toxicology. She currently the Dean of the College of Biological Sciences at the University of Minnesota. Her research expertise is in ecotoxicology, where she primarily studies effects of environmental stresses on organisms at different levels of biological organization.

Education 
As an undergraduate student, Forbes received B. A.'s in Biology and Geology at Binghamton University in 1983.   She later attended Stony Brook University, completing her M.S. in Marine Environmental Sciences in 1984, and her PhD in Coastal Oceanography in 1988.

Scientific contributions 
Research in the Forbes lab is aimed at improving environmental management through increased understanding of how risks, such as exposure to toxins and temperature change, impact ecosystems.  With over 350 peer reviewed publications and a google scholar citation index of 8658, Forbes is an internationally recognized expert in assessing risks to complex ecosystems through population modeling.  Her expertise led to her participation of an advisory council formed to advise SETAC-Europe about using mechanistic effect models for ecological risk assessment of chemicals.

Professional positions

Awards and honors 

 Helmholtz International Fellow
 Fellow of the University of Minnesota Institute of the Environment
 Member of the Board of Directors, Minnesota Freshwater Society
 Fulbright Scholar, Odense University, DK

Professional activities 

 Editorial Board, PeerJ, 2017–Present
 Editorial Board, Integrated Environmental Assessment and Management, 2018–Present
 Editorial Board, Human and Ecological Risk Assessment, 2005–Present
 Editorial Board, Marine Environmental Research, 2000–Present
 Invited Member of the Spinoza Prize Selection Committee, Netherlands Organization for Scientific Research, 2013–16
 Editorial Board, Ecotoxicology and Environmental Safety, 2004-13
 Director, Centre for Integrated Population Ecology, 2005–09
 Danish Natural Sciences Research Council Member, 2001–07

External links 
 University of Minnesota lab page
 European Food Safety Authority Conference Discussion 24 September 2018

Representative publications

References 

Living people
Environmental scientists
Year of birth missing (living people)
American women scientists
University of Minnesota faculty
Stony Brook University alumni
Binghamton University alumni
American ecologists
American women academics
21st-century American women